This was the first edition of the tournament.

Wishaya Trongcharoenchaikul and Kittipong Wachiramanowong won the title after defeating Sanchai and Sonchat Ratiwatana 7–6(11–9), 6–3 in the final.

Seeds

Draw

References
 Main Draw

Doubles
Wind Energy Holding Bangkok Open - Doubles
 in Thai tennis